Fyt or FYT may refer to:

 Faya-Largeau Airport, in Chad
 FPT Young Talents, Vietnamese youth organization
 Jan Fyt (1611–1661), Flemish painter